Habenaria exilis, commonly known as the wispy rein orchid, is a species of orchid that is endemic to a small area in far north Queensland. It usually has two leaves at its base and up to fifteen tiny whitish flowers.

Description 
The dorsal sepal and petals overlap at their bases and form a hood over the column. Flowering occurs between January and April.

Taxonomy and naming
Habenaria exilis was first formally described in 1998 by David Jones from a specimen collected near Rossville by Lewis Roberts in 1993 and the description was published in The Orchadian. The specific epithet (exilis) is a Latin word meaning "thin", "slender", "meager" or "poor ".

Distribution and habitat
The wispy rein orchid has a narrow distribution near Rossville where it grows with grasses in sparse woodland which is partly flooded in summer.

References

Orchids of Queensland
Endemic orchids of Australia
Plants described in 1998
exilis